John Matthews (born July 19, 1986) is a former American football wide receiver. He was signed by the Indianapolis Colts as an undrafted free agent in 2009. He played college football at University of San Diego.

He was also a member of the Jacksonville Jaguars, Miami Dolphins, and San Francisco 49ers.

Professional career

Jacksonville Jaguars
Matthews was claimed of waivers by the Jacksonville Jaguars on July 21, 2010. He was cut on September 4, 2010, but signed on to the Jaguars' practice squad on September 5, 2010. He was elevated to the active roster in time for the week 1 game against the Denver Broncos. He was released on September 16, 2010. Matthews was later re-signed to the Jaguars' practice squad. Prior to Jacksonville's week 10 game against the Houston Texans, he was elevated to the active roster.

He was waived on August 13, 2011.

Miami Dolphins
Matthews signed with the Miami Dolphins on August 16, 2011, and was released on September 2, 2011, becoming a free agent.

San Francisco 49ers
Matthews was signed to the practice squad on October 4, 2011. On November 15, 2011, Matthews was released from the 49ers' practice squad, when safety Mark Legree was signed to practice squad, but was re-signed on November 29, 2011. He was released from the 49ers on May 14, 2012.

Personal life
He resides in Littleton, Colorado. He attended Regis Jesuit High School in Aurora, Colorado.

References

External links
 Jacksonville Jaguars bio

1986 births
Living people
Sportspeople from Aurora, Colorado
Sportspeople from Littleton, Colorado
Players of American football from Colorado
American football wide receivers
San Diego Toreros football players
Indianapolis Colts players
Jacksonville Jaguars players
Miami Dolphins players
San Francisco 49ers players